Topli Dol is a village located in the municipality of Surdulica, Serbia. As of 2011 census, the village has a population of 58 inhabitants.

References

Populated places in Pčinja District